Danil Vladislavovich Krugovoy (born 28 May 1998) is a Russian football player who plays as a left-back for FC Zenit Saint Petersburg and the Russia national team.

Club career
He made his debut in the Russian Football National League for FC Zenit-2 St. Petersburg on 9 November 2016 in a game against FC Tyumen.

On 18 June 2018, he signed a 4-year contract with FC Ufa.

On 21 August 2019, he signed a 5-year contract with FC Zenit Saint Petersburg and was loaned back to FC Ufa for the 2019–20 season.

International career
He was a late substitute in one game for Russia national under-17 football team at the 2015 UEFA European Under-17 Championship. Later he started all four games the team played at the 2015 FIFA U-17 World Cup.

He was called up to the Russia national football team for the first time in October 2021 for the World Cup qualifiers against Cyprus and Croatia. He was included in the extended 41-players list of candidates. He was next called up for a training camp in March 2022, at the time of Russia's suspension from international football. He made his debut on 24 September 2022 in a friendly game against Kyrgyzstan.

Honours
Zenit Saint Petersburg
 Russian Premier League: 2020–21, 2021–22
 Russian Super Cup: 2022

Career statistics

References

External links
 
 
 
 Profile by Russian Football National League

1998 births
Footballers from Saint Petersburg
Living people
Russian footballers
Association football fullbacks
Russia youth international footballers
Russia under-21 international footballers
Russia international footballers
FC Zenit Saint Petersburg players
FC Ufa players
Russian Premier League players
Russian First League players
Russian Second League players
Russian people of Ukrainian descent
FC Zenit-2 Saint Petersburg players